Georgios Savvidis (born 27 March 1974) is a Greek former professional footballer who played as a midfielder.

References

1974 births
Living people
Greek footballers
Kastoria F.C. players
ILTEX Lykoi F.C. players
Kallithea F.C. players
Ergotelis F.C. players
Ethnikos Asteras F.C. players
Korinthos F.C. players
Enosi Panaspropyrgiakou Doxas players
Super League Greece players
Association football midfielders
Footballers from Kastoria